Bouard Lithawat (born ) is a Thai female volleyball player. She was part of the Thailand women's national volleyball team.

She participated in the 2004 FIVB Volleyball World Grand Prix. On club level she played for RBAC, Bangkok, Thailand, in 2004.

References

External links
 Profile at FIVB.org

1984 births
Living people
Bouard Lithawat
Place of birth missing (living people)
Bouard Lithawat
Bouard Lithawat